The 2008 Team Ice Racing World Championship was the 30th edition of the Team World Championship. The final was held on ?, 2008, in Krasnogorsk, in Russia. Russia won their 14th title.

Final Classification

See also 
 2008 Individual Ice Racing World Championship
 2008 Speedway World Cup in classic speedway
 2008 Speedway Grand Prix in classic speedway

References 

Ice speedway competitions
World